The year 1900 in science and technology involved some significant events, listed below.

Aeronautics
 July 2 – The first rigid airship flight is made by the LZ1 designed by Ferdinand von Zeppelin.
 c. October 3 – The Wright brothers begin their first manned glider experimental flights at Kitty Hawk, North Carolina and failed for the first few attempts

Chemistry
 Moses Gomberg identifies the first organic radical (according to the modern definition), triphenylmethyl radical.
 Johannes Rydberg refines the expression for observed hydrogen line wavelengths.

Earth sciences
 Richard Dixon Oldham distinguishes between primary, secondary and tertiary waveforms as recorded by seismometers.

Exploration
 American explorer Robert Peary first sights Kaffeklubben Island, the northernmost point of land on Earth.

Genetics
 Hugo de Vries publishes the results of his experiments in Mendelian inheritance.

Mathematics
 Max Dehn introduces two examples of Dehn plane and the Dehn invariant.
 David Hilbert states his list of 23 problems which show where some further mathematical work is needed.
 Russell's paradox is first discovered by Ernst Zermelo but he does not publish it, and it is known only to Hilbert, Husserl and other members of the University of Göttingen.
 Gaston Tarry confirms Euler's conjecture that no 6×6 orthogonal Graeco-Latin square is possible.
 Alfred Young introduces the Young tableau.

Medicine 
 English surgeon and ophthalmologist Edward Treacher Collins describes the essential traits of Treacher Collins syndrome.
 German gynecologist Hermann Johannes Pfannenstiel publishes his description of the "Pfannenstiel incision", a transverse incision used in genitourinary surgery that continues to be widely used.

Paleontology
 Barnum Brown finds the first partial skeleton of Tyrannosaurus rex in eastern Wyoming.
 Dr. James K. Hampson identifies the Island 35 Mastodon skeleton in the Mississippi River.

Photography
 Kodak introduce their first Brownie (camera).

Physics
 April 26 – Guglielmo Marconi patents the tuned circuit.
 October 19 – Max Planck produces Planck's law of black-body radiation and Planck constant, marking the birth of quantum physics.
 December 7 – Max Planck states his quantum hypothesis.
 December 23 – Reginald Fessenden, experimenting with a high-frequency spark transmitter, successfully transmits speech over a distance of about 1.6 kilometers (one mile), from Cobb Island, Maryland, which appears to have been the first audio radio transmission.
 Gamma rays discovered by Paul Villard while studying uranium decay.

Physiology
 Karl Landsteiner makes the first discovery of blood types, identifying the ABO blood group system.
 Carl Rasch coins the term 'polymorphous light eruption'.
 Jōkichi Takamine and Keizo Uenaka discover adrenaline.

Zoology
 Richard J. Ussher and Robert Warren publish The Birds of Ireland.

Awards
 Copley Medal: Marcellin Berthelot

Births
 January 2 – Una Ledingham (died 1965), English physician specialising in diabetes mellitus and pregnancy.
 March 4 – Heinrich Willi (died 1971), Swiss pediatrician.
 March 8 – Howard H. Aiken (died 1973), American computing pioneer.
 March 19 – Frédéric Joliot (died 1958), French physicist.
 April 3 – Albert Ingham (died 1967), English mathematician.
 April 25 – Wolfgang Pauli (died 1958), Austrian-born physicist.
 April 26 – Charles Richter (died 1985), American geophysicist and inventor.
 April 28 – Jan Oort (died 1992), Dutch astronomer.
 May 5 – Helen Redfield (died 1988), American geneticist.
 May 6 – Zheng Ji (died 2010), Chinese biochemist and nutritionist.
 May 10 – Cecilia Payne-Gaposchkin (died 1979), English-born American astronomer and astrophysicist.
 May 22 – Honor Fell (died 1986), English biologist.
 June 24 – Wilhelm Cauer (killed 1945), German mathematician and electronic engineer.
 June 25 – Philip D'Arcy Hart (died 2006), English medical researcher, pioneer in tuberculosis treatment.
 June 30 – James Stagg (died 1975) Scottish meteorologist.
 July 9 – Frances McConnell-Mills, born Frances Mary McConnell (died 1975), American toxicologist.
 August 25 – Hans Adolf Krebs (died 1981), German-born medical doctor and biochemist.
 August 26 – Hellmuth Walter (died 1980), German-born engineer and inventor.
 October 2 – Isabella Forshall (died 1989), English pediatric surgeon.
 November 5 – Ethelwynn Trewavas (died 1993), English ichthyologist.
 December 9 – Joseph Needham (died 1995), English biochemist and writer on the history of science and technology in China.
 December 12 – Mária Telkes (died 1995), Hungarian-American scientist and inventor.
 December 17 – Mary Cartwright (died 1998), English mathematician, one of the first people to analyze a dynamical system with chaos.
 Robina Addis (died 1986), English pioneering professional psychiatric social worker.
 Ernest Gibbins (killed 1942), English entomologist.

Deaths
 January 13 – Peter Waage (born 1833), Norwegian chemist.
 January 22 – David E. Hughes (born 1831), British-American inventor.
 March 6 – Gottlieb Daimler (born 1834), German engineer, automotive pioneer.
 March 10 – George James Symons (born 1838), English meteorologist.
 April 1 – George Jackson Mivart (born 1827), English biologist.
 August 4 – Étienne Lenoir (born 1822), Belgian mechanical engineer.
 August 31 – John Bennet Lawes (born 1814), English agricultural scientist.
 October 16 – Henry Acland (born 1815), English physician.
 October 29 – Bruno Abakanowicz (born 1852), Polish mathematician, inventor and electrical engineer.

References

 
19th century in science
1900s in science